Miguel Bruno Almeida Soares (born 9 February 1993 in Bustelo - Oliveira de Azeméis) is a Portuguese footballer who plays for SC Bustelo as a midfielder.

Football career
On 27 July 2013, Soares made his professional debut with Oliveirense in a 2013–14 Taça da Liga match against Moreirense, when he replaced Hélder Silva (83rd minute).
.

References

External links

1993 births
Living people
Portuguese footballers
Association football midfielders
U.D. Oliveirense players